Aliabad (also Romanized as ‘Alīābād; also known as ‘Alīābād-e Chehel Gazī, ‘Alīābād-e Ernān, and Deh Aliābād) is a village in Ernan Rural District, in the Central District of Mehriz County, Yazd Province, Iran. At the 2006 census, its population was 332, in 100 families.

References 

Populated places in Mehriz County